Gordon Gibson "Gib" Hutchinson (25 December 1912 – 30 December 1996}) was a Canadian-British ice hockey goaltender who had a long and successful career in the English National League (ENL). He was inducted into the British Ice Hockey Hall of Fame in 1951. He married Audrey Wells, daughter of boxing champion Bombardier Billy Wells, in 1942.

Career
Hutchinson came to Britain in 1936 when he joined the Earls Court Rangers. However, he had a poor start to his British ice hockey career, giving up 232 goals in forty games. Deciding his future in ice hockey looked bleak, Hutchinson worked as a carpenter at the Earls Court Exhibition Centre. When the goaltender who replaced Hutchinson was injured, he was asked to play again. The following season, 1938–39, Hutchinson was named to the ENL All-star team. An honour he was to receive another four times during his career playing for Streatham, the Wembley Lions and the Brighton Tigers. Whilst with the Tigers, Hutchinson helped them to with the league championship in 1946–47 and 1947–48, and the Autumn Cup in 1946 and 1950.

When Hutchinson retired from playing, he became the stage manager for the Tom Arnold Ice Show at the Brighton Sports Stadium. Later in life, he ran a number of public houses in Sussex before he died on 30 December 1996 at the Mile Oak Inn in Portslade near Brighton.

Awards and honours
Named to the ENL All-star team in 1939, 1940, 1947, 1948 and 1951.
Inducted to the British Ice Hockey Hall of Fame in 1951.

Footnotes

References
A to Z Encyclopaedia of Ice Hockey
Ice Hockey Journalists UK

External links
A to Z Encyclopaedia of Ice Hockey entry
British Ice Hockey Hall of Fame entry

1912 births
1996 deaths
Brighton Tigers players
British Ice Hockey Hall of Fame inductees
Canadian ice hockey goaltenders
Canadian emigrants to the United Kingdom
Earls Court Rangers players
Ice hockey people from Saskatchewan
People from Swift Current
Wembley Lions players
Canadian expatriate ice hockey players in England